is a Japanese footballer who plays as a left winger or a left back for Sanfrecce Hiroshima.

Playing career
Higashi was born in Ehime Prefecture. He joined J1 League club Sanfrecce Hiroshima from youth team in 2018. On 22 August, he debuted against Nagoya Grampus in Emperor's Cup.

Career statistics
Last update: 4 December 2021

References

External links

2000 births
Living people
Association football people from Ehime Prefecture
Japanese footballers
Japan youth international footballers
Association football midfielders
Sanfrecce Hiroshima players
J1 League players
Japan under-20 international footballers